Bird's Rock may refer to;
Craig yr Aderyn, a hill in north-west Wales
Kuşkayası Monument, a monument in Bartın Province, Turkey